Rajuvula (Greek  ; Brahmi: , ; Kharosthi:  , ;  , ;) was an Indo-Scythian Great Satrap (Mahākṣatrapa), one of the "Northern Satraps" who ruled in the area of Mathura in the northern Indian Subcontinent in the years around 10 CE. The Mathura lion capital was consecrated under the reign of Rajuvula. In central India, the Indo-Scythians had conquered the area of Mathura from Indian kings around 60 BCE. Some of their satraps were Hagamasha and Hagana, who were in turn followed by Rajuvula.

Name

Biography
Rajuvula is thought to have invaded the last of the Indo-Greek territories in the eastern Punjab, and replaced the last of the Indo-Greek kings, Strato II and Strato III. The main coinage of Rajuvula imitated that of the Indo-Greek rulers he supplanted.

The Mathura lion capital, an Indo-Scythian sandstone capital from Mathura in Central India, and dated to the 1st century CE, describes in kharoshthi the gift of a stupa with a relic of the Buddha, by queen Nadasi Kasa, "the wife of Rajuvula" and "daughter of Aiyasi Kamuia", which was an older view supported by Bühler, Rapson, Lüders and others. But according to a later view propounded by Sten Konow, and accepted by later scholars, the principal donor making endowments was princess Aiyasi Kamuia, "chief queen of Rajuvula"  and "daughter of Yuvaraja Kharaosta Kamuio". Nadasi Kasa (or Nada Diaka) was daughter of Ayasia Kamuia.

According to an older view, Yuvaraja Kharaosta Kamuio was thought to be the son of Ayasi Kamuia who in turn was thought to be the widow of Arta whom Rajuvula later married. Konow refuted this view, and concluded that Ayasia Kamuia, chief queen of Rajuvula, was the daughter and not the mother of Kharaosta Kamuio. The fact that the last name 'Kamuia' has been used both by Yuvaraja Kharaosta as well as the princess Aiyasi clearly proves that Aiyasi Kamuia was the daughter and not the mother of Yuvaraja Kharaosta Kamuio (Kambojaka), since such family-names or designations are naturally inherited from the father's side and not from the mother's. Hence, Dr Konow's interpretation appears more convincing.

The capital also mentions the genealogy of several Indo-Scythian satraps of Mathura.

The presence of the Buddhist symbol triratana at the center of the capital suggests that Rajuvula was, at least nominally, following the Buddhist faith.

Several other inscription from Mathura mention Rajuvula, such as the Mora Well Inscription.

Sodasa, son of Rajuvula, succeeded him and also made Mathura his capital.

Coinage of Rajuvula

Notes

References

External links
Coins of Rajuvula

Indo-Scythian kings
1st-century monarchs in Asia
1st-century Iranian people